The Professional Guest is a 1931 British comedy film directed by George King and starring Gordon Harker, Pat Paterson and Richard Bird. It was made at Walton Studios as a quota quickie for release by Fox Film.

Cast
 Gordon Harker as Joe  
 Pat Paterson as Marjorie Phibsby  
 Richard Bird as The Guest  
 Garry Marsh as Seton Fanshawe  
 Barbara Gott as Lady Phibsby  
 Hay Plumb as Sir Alfred Phibsby  
 Syd Crossley as Crump

References

Bibliography
 Low, Rachael. Filmmaking in 1930s Britain. George Allen & Unwin, 1985.
 Wood, Linda. British Films, 1927-1939. British Film Institute, 1986.

External links

1931 films
British comedy films
1931 comedy films
Films shot at Nettlefold Studios
Films directed by George King
Quota quickies
Films set in England
British black-and-white films
1930s English-language films
1930s British films